The Mucajaí River is a river of Roraima state in northern Brazil. It is a right tributary of the Branco River.

Part of the river's basin is in the Roraima National Forest.

See also
List of rivers of Roraima

References

Brazilian Ministry of Transport

Rivers of Roraima